Imeni Michurina is the name of several rural localities in Russia:
Imeni Michurina, Republic of Dagestan, a selo in Derbentsky District of the Republic of Dagestan
Imeni Michurina, Republic of Tatarstan, a settlement in Leninogorsky District of the Republic of Tatarstan

See also
Michurin (disambiguation)
Michurina (rural locality)